The 2020–21 Nashville Predators season was the 23rd season for the National Hockey League franchise that was established on June 25, 1997. John Hynes entered his second season as coach and first full season as head coach of the team. On December 20, 2020, the league temporarily realigned into four divisions with no conferences due to the COVID-19 pandemic and the ongoing closure of the Canada–United States border. As a result of this realignment, the Predators remained in the Central Division this season and would only play games against the other teams in their realigned division during the regular season and potentially the first two rounds of the playoffs.

On May 8, 2021, the Predators clinched a playoff berth after a 3–1 win over the Carolina Hurricanes. They were eliminated from the playoffs in the first round with a 4–3  overtime loss to the Carolina Hurricanes in game six.

Standings

Schedule and results

Regular season
The regular season schedule was published on December 23, 2020.

Playoffs

Draft picks

Below are the Nashville Predators selections at the 2020 NHL Draft which was held on October 6–7 at the NHL Studios.

Notes

References

Nashville Predators seasons
Nashville Predators
Nashville Predators
Nashville Predators